Hendrik Christopher Jogis (Estonian: Chris Jõgis; born 24 May 1965 in Palo Alto, California) is a retired male badminton player from the United States.

Career
Between 1985 and 1992 Jogis won the U.S. men's singles title six times, and shared the men's doubles title four times and the mixed doubles title twice. He won men's singles at the Swiss Open in 1986, and both singles and men's doubles at the Iceland International in 1988. Jogis was a member of the U.S. Thomas Cup teams of 1986, 1988, 1990 and 1992. He competed at the 1992 Barcelona Olympics in men's singles, losing in the second round to Teeranun Chiangta, of Thailand, 11–15, 15–3, 15–3.

References

External links
 
 
 

1965 births
Living people
American people of Estonian descent
American male badminton players
Badminton players at the 1992 Summer Olympics
Olympic badminton players of the United States